The Beverly-Begg Observatory is a New Zealand astronomical observatory, situated on Robin Hood Park in the Belleknowes part of Dunedin's town belt. It was established in 1922 by the Dunedin Astronomical Society (DAS) and is the home of the group. The annex was added in the 1960s.

The observatory is named after local astronomers Arthur Beverly (1822-1907) and John Campbell Begg (1876-1965).

On 6 September 2008 the society unveiled a new 35 cm Celestron instrument on a Software Bisque Paramount ME robotic telescope mount with camera totalling $38,000, replacing a 30.5 cm reflector telescope that had been in use since 1973. In addition $9,000 was spent upgrading the observatory facilities, including raising the floor by 1 m and installing computer screens displaying images captured by the telescope.

The observatory is open to the public on Sunday nights from 7:30 pm during the winter months (when New Zealand daylight saving time is not in force). Access for education and private groups may be made by arrangement through the Dunedin Astronomical Society's education officer.

The annex is used by the society for meetings and talks. The observatory facilities are available for DAS members to use.

References

Buildings and structures in Dunedin
Astronomical observatories in New Zealand
Education in Dunedin
Organisations based in Dunedin
1920s architecture in New Zealand